The Mityana–Sekanyonyi–Busunju Road is a road in Uganda, connecting the towns of Mityana, Sekanyonyi and Busunju in Mityana District.

Location
The road starts in the center of Mityana town, on the Mityana–Mubende Road. It proceeds north, first following the route of the Mityana–Bukuya–Kiboga Road. The coordinates of his road at Sekayonyi are 0°30'04.0"N, 32°08'21.0"E (Latitude:0.501103; Longitude:32.139176).

Overview
This road is an important transportation link between the Kampala to Hoima and the Kampala to Fort Portal transport corridors. As at June 2016, the road is murram-surfaced. President Yoweri Museveni, during his re-election campaign in January 2016, mentioned this road as one of those planned for upgrade to class II bitumen standard.

See also
 Uganda National Roads Authority

References

External links
 Webpage of Uganda National Road Authority

Roads in Uganda
Mityana District
Central Region, Uganda